Cingulina rugosa is a species of sea snail, a marine gastropod mollusk in the family Pyramidellidae, the pyrams and their allies.

Distribution
This marine species occurs off the coasts of Vietnam.

References

Pyramidellidae
Gastropods described in 1959